Brilliant rasbora (Rasbora einthovenii) is a species of ray-finned fish in the genus Rasbora. They are found in the Malay Peninsula and in Borneo. Adults can grow up to 5 cm (2 inches)

References 

Fish of Thailand
Rasboras
Fauna of Brunei
Freshwater fish of Indonesia
Freshwater fish of Malaysia
Fish of Singapore
Freshwater fish of Borneo
Taxa named by Pieter Bleeker
Fish described in 1851